Helen Kleeb (January 6, 1907 – December 28, 2003) was an American film and television actress. In a career covering nearly 50 years, she may be best known for her role from 1972 to 1981 as Miss Mamie Baldwin on the family drama The Waltons.

Early life and career
Kleeb began acting on stage in Portland, Oregon, late in the 1920s, where she attended the Ellison-White Conservatory of Music. She also gained her first radio experience in Portland.

From 1949 to 1951, she performed voices for the radio program Candy Matson. In 1956–1957, Kleeb guest-starred on Hey, Jeannie!, starring Jeannie Carson. In the 1960–1961 television season, Kleeb appeared as Miss Claridge, a legal secretary, on the sitcom Harrigan and Son.

She appeared in episodes of Dennis the Menace, I Love Lucy, Pete and Gladys, Hennesey, Death Valley Days, Get Smart, The Andy Griffith Show, Green Acres, Bewitched,  Gunsmoke, Little House: A New Beginning, Highway to Heaven, Room 222, and The Golden Girls as well as in small film roles in The Manchurian Candidate, and Hush, Hush, Sweet Charlotte. She also appeared in a number of episodes of The Waltons, Dragnet, starring Jack Webb, during the 1950s. Helen also appeared on many radio drama shows, some now playing on XM Satellite Radio.

Personal life
Kleeb married twice, the first time on November 27, 1937, to John Gerald Pendergast. One son, Thomas Arthur Prendergast was born to this union. Then, on April 18, 1959, she married Elmer L. Garrison, a union that lasted over four decades, until Helen died in Los Angeles on December 28, 2003.

Kleeb's marriage to Pendergast and the birth of their son caused a hiatus in her career. After her husband's death, she taught drama at a college before she returned to acting.

Filmography

References

External links
 

1907 births
2003 deaths
American film actresses
American television actresses
American radio actresses
Actresses from Los Angeles
Actresses from Portland, Oregon
Actresses from Washington (state)
People from South Bend, Washington
Ellison-White Conservatory of Music alumni
20th-century American actresses
21st-century American women